Mirzo Tursunzoda (formerly: Oktyabr) is a town and jamoat in Tajikistan. It is located in Shahrinav District, one of the Districts of Republican Subordination. The population of the town is 7,900 (January 2020 estimate).

References

Populated places in Districts of Republican Subordination
Jamoats of Tajikistan